Dana Celeste Jones  (born June 26, 1976) is an American Democratic member of the Maryland House of Delegates appointed in April 2020 to replace Alice J. Cain. Jones is the current communications vice president for the Junior League of Annapolis. She previously was the research director for EMILY's List and was a legislative aide to then-U.S. Representative (now Senator ) Ben Cardin (D-MD). She helped Anne Arundel County Executive Steuart Pittman with debate preparation during his 2018 campaign and was campaign manager for Robert Zirkin's House of Delegates campaign in the 1998 election.

Committee appointments
Jones' committee appointments have been Appropriations Committee, 2023-; Joint Committee on Administrative, Executive and Legislative Review, 2023-; Ways and Means Committee, 2020-23. Jones moved from Ways and Means to Appropriations in 2023, swapping assignments with Del. Shaneka Henson when questions were raised about a potential conflict of interest involving Henson's legal work for a nonprofit which received state funding.

Bills sponsored by Dana Jones
MD HB718 Anne Arundel County - Local Development Council - Delegate Appointments
MD HB588 Community Action Agencies - Provision of Feminine Hygiene Products
MD HB685 Education – Regional Resource Centers and Libraries – Funding

References

1976 births
21st-century American politicians
21st-century American women politicians
Living people
Democratic Party members of the Maryland House of Delegates
Towson University alumni
Women state legislators in Maryland
Politicians from Cumberland, Maryland
Politicians from Annapolis, Maryland